Black Sound Cay National Reserve is a national park on Green Turtle Cay in North Abaco, the Bahamas.

Flora and fauna
The mangrove area includes red, white and black mangroves, and buttonwood, creating sheltered nursery waters for groupers, crawfish and conch. The park provides important habitat for birds such as the white-cheeked pintail and the West Indian whistling duck, and for migratory bird species including the painted bunting, indigo bunting, American redstart, black-and-white warbler and magnolia warbler.

References

National parks of the Bahamas
Abaco Islands